Bagh Ku (also Romanized as Bāgh Kū; also known as Bāgh Kūh) is a village in Taheri Rural District, in the Central District of Kangan County, Bushehr Province, Iran. At the 2006 census, its population was 109, in 23 families.

References 

Populated places in Kangan County